
Gmina Orły is a rural gmina (administrative district) in Przemyśl County, Subcarpathian Voivodeship, in south-eastern Poland.

Villages
Gmina Orły contains the villages and settlements of Ciemięrzowice, Drohojów, Duńkowiczki, Hnatkowice, Kaszyce, Małkowice, Orły, Trójczyce, Wacławice, Walawa and Zadąbrowie.

Neighbouring gminas
Gmina Orły is bordered by the gminas of Chłopice, Radymno, Stubno and Żurawica.

References

Polish official population figures 2006

Orly
Przemyśl County